Edward McGuire (1932–1986) was an Irish painter.

Biography 

The Irish portraitist, still-life artist and bird painter Edward McGuire was born in Dublin in 1932. He studied painting, drawing and the history of art at the Accademia di Belle Arti di Roma in 1953 and at the Slade School of Fine Art in 1954. In the early 1950s he befriended artists and writers such as Patrick Swift (who encouraged McGuire to paint), Anthony Cronin and Lucian Freud (Slade). He travelled in France and Italy from 1951 to 1953 and lived on the Aran Islands off County Galway from 1955 to 1956. From then until his death in November 1986 he resided in Dublin with wife Sara (Sally) McGuire who died May 2011.

Exhibitions

Edward McGuire's paintings were widely exhibited during his lifetime. He had solo shows at the Dawson Gallery, Dublin (A Recent Painting, 1969); Taylor Galleries, Dublin (1983), and a retrospective at the Royal Hibernian Academy Gallagher Gallery (1991). In addition, he exhibited in such group art shows as: Irish Exhibition of Living Art (1953–71); Royal Hibernian Academy (1962–86); Hendriks Gallery, Dublin (1970); Hugh Lane Municipal Gallery of Modern Art (1971); Ulster Museum, Belfast (1973); Oireachtas (1973–80); Cagnes-sur-Mer 6th International Festival of Painting (1974); Concours pour le Prix de Portrait Paul-Louis Weiller, Academie des Beaux Arts, Paris (1979). All this, notwithstanding, McGuire used a laboriously meticulous painting technique which led to the completion of only about six works of art a year. McGuire's keen interest in bird-painting stemmed from the association in his youth with a taxidermist at the Natural History Museum in Dublin. McGuire purchased three stuffed specimens from Mr Williams, starting a bird collection whose members he painted repeatedly in intricate detail 
throughout his career.

Portraits

Edward McGuire was a prolific portrait artist and painted over 25 portraits of poets and writers.  He first exhibited at the Royal Hibernian Academy (RHA) in 1962 and became an academician in 1978. His subjects included: Séamus Heaney (1974), Pearse Hutchinson (1970), Michael Hartnett (1971), Anthony Cronin (1977), John Jordan, Seán Ó Faoláin (1978), Ulick O'Connor (1978), James White (1981), John Montague (1983) and Liam Cosgrave (1982).

Awards 

A member of Aosdána from 1984,  McGuire won numerous awards during his distinguished career, including the 1974 Festival International de la Peinture, Cagnes-sur-Mer; the Douglas Hyde Gold Medal (1976) and the Marten Toonder Award (1978). He received honourable mention in the Concours Paul-Louis Weiller (1979). His paintings are held in many private and public collections, including: Ulster Museum, Belfast; the National Gallery of Ireland; the Hugh Lane Municipal Gallery of Modern Art in Dublin; The National Museum; Trinity College Dublin;University College Dublin; University College Cork; Dublin City University, Among his awards were the Prix National from the Cagnes-sur-Mer 6th International Festival of Painting (1974); the Douglas Hyde Gold Medal (1976); the RHA Award (1976), and the Marten Toonder Award (1978). He received honourable mention in the Concours Paul-Louis Weiller (1979).

Collections 

His work is included in the collections of the Limerick City Gallery of Art, Limerick; Ulster Museum, Belfast; the National Gallery of Ireland; the Hugh Lane Municipal Gallery of Modern Art in Dublin; National Museum of Ireland; Trinity College Dublin; University College Dublin; University College Cork; PJ Carroll and Co., Dublin City University, Dublin Writers Museum and the Irish Museum of Modern Art.

References

Further reading 
Edward McGuire (Dublin: Irish Academic Press 1991), Brian Fallon.

External links
 Irish Arts Review
 Visual Arts, Cork. Artist Biography.
 Dictionary of Irish People
 Sailing to Byzantium: The Portraits of Edward McGuire
 Arts Council
 Irish Arts Review
 Irish Independent
 Artnet.com
 Visula Arts
 AskArt.com
 McGuire family
 Whytes.ie
 Adams.ie

1986 deaths
1932 births
20th-century Irish painters
Irish male painters
Modern painters
Painters from Dublin (city)
People from County Kildare
Alumni of University College London
Alumni of the Slade School of Fine Art
20th-century Irish male artists